Ching Miao (March 15, 1913 – 1989) was a Taiwanese actor born in Shandong, China. He had appeared in over 190 films, mostly in Hong Kong for the Shaw Brothers Studio.

He won the Best Supporting Actor for Golden Horse Awards twice, for Between Tears and Smiles (1964) and Too Late for Love (1967) respectively.

Actress Ching Li is his daughter.

Filmography 
 1940 Storm on the Border	 	 
 1945My Homeland - Miao Du-Shan.

External links
 
 

1913 births
1989 deaths
20th-century Taiwanese male actors
Male actors from Jinan
Taiwanese people from Shandong